Raymond Jones (24 September 1903 – 1978) was an Australian boxer who competed in the 1924 Summer Olympics. In 1924 he was eliminated in the first round of the middleweight class after losing his fight to Ben Funk of the US.

References

External links
profile

1903 births
1978 deaths
Middleweight boxers
Olympic boxers of Australia
Boxers at the 1924 Summer Olympics
Australian male boxers